The 2008 If Stockholm Open was a men's tennis tournament played on indoor hard courts. It was the 40th edition of the event known that year as the If Stockholm Open, and was part of the International Series of the 2008 ATP Tour. It took place at the Kungliga tennishallen in Stockholm, Sweden, from 6 October through 12 October 2008.

The singles draw featured ATP No. 7, Buenos Aires champion, Acapulco runner-up David Nalbandian, Wimbledon quarterfinalist, Marseille finalist Mario Ančić, and Australian Open quarterfinalist, Adelaide runner-up Jarkko Nieminen. Also lined up were Rotterdam and Memphis finalist Robin Söderling, Wimbledon semifinalist Rainer Schüttler, José Acasuso, Albert Montañés and Marcel Granollers.

First-seeded David Nalbandian won the singles title.

Finals

Singles

 David Nalbandian defeated  Robin Söderling, 6–2, 5–7, 6–3
It was David Nalbandian's 2nd singles title of the year and the  9th of his career.

Doubles

 Jonas Björkman /  Kevin Ullyett defeated  Johan Brunström /  Michael Ryderstedt, 6–1, 6–3

References

External links
 Official website 
 Singles draw
 Doubles draw